The 1874 North Staffordshire by-election was fought on 23 March 1874.  The byelection was fought due to the incumbent Conservative MP, Charles Adderley, becoming President of the Board of Trade.  It was retained by the incumbent.

References

1874 elections in the United Kingdom
1874 in England
19th century in Staffordshire
March 1874 events
By-elections to the Parliament of the United Kingdom in Staffordshire constituencies
Unopposed ministerial by-elections to the Parliament of the United Kingdom in English constituencies